Ashkenaz may refer to:
Germany, in a medieval Jewish context
A member (or descent) of the Yiddish-speaking Ashkenazi Jewish community, a branch of European Jewry formed in Medieval Germany
 Nusach Ashkenaz, a style of Jewish religious service conducted by Ashkenazi Jews
 Chassidei Ashkenaz, a Jewish movement in the 12th century and 13th century
 Ashkenaz, Gomer's first son in the Bible
 Ashkenaz Foundation, in the Canadian city of Toronto, Ontario
 Ashkenaz (music venue), a music and dance center in the U.S. city of Berkeley, California

See also
Ashkenazi (surname)